James D. Ward (born 1935) is an associate justice of the California Courts of Appeal, Fourth District, Division Two.  As an attorney, he argued two cases in front of the U.S. Supreme Court that defined key rights for the free press under the First Amendment of the U.S. Constitution.

Biography

Education

Ward graduated from Longfellow Grade School in Sioux Falls, South Dakota in 1949.  He graduated from Washington High School, also in Sioux Falls, in 1953.

Between 1953 and 1954, Ward attended classes at both the University of Oslo in Norway and the University of Vienna in Austria.  He earned his Bachelor of Arts from the University of South Dakota in 1957. Ward then matriculated at the University of San Francisco, where he earned his J.D. degree in 1959.

Military service

Ward served on active duty in the U.S. Army from 1959 to 1960.  He then served in the Army Reserve from 1960 to 1965 and rose to the rank of First Sergeant.

Legal career

On January 9, 1960, Ward was admitted to the California Bar.  He was admitted to practice in the U.S. District Court, Southern District of California in 1964. Ward was admitted to practice before U.S. Supreme Court on May 14, 1979, where he went on to win two First Amendment Rights cases.

Ward served as a Deputy District Attorney for Riverside County from 1960 to 1961.  He then went into practice with the law firm of Badger, Schulte & Ward in 1961, where he continued to work until 1964. He left Badger, Schulte & Ward in 1964 to go into civil litigation practice dealing with media-related law in 1964 with Thompson & Colegate where he continued to work until 1993. He became a Superior Court judge in 1993, receiving an appointment from Governor Pete Wilson on November 29, 1993.  On April 24, 1996, Governor Wilson appointed him an associate justice of the California Court of Appeal; his appointment was subsequently confirmed by a popular vote of the California electorate on November 3, 1998.

It was during his time working for Thompson & Colegate that Ward successfully argued and won two landmark First Amendment cases in front of the United States Supreme Court on behalf of The Press-Enterprise: Press Enterprise v. Superior Court (I) 464 U.S. 501, and Press Enterprise v. Superior Court (II) 478 U.S. 1.

Teaching career
 Instructor for the California Judicial Education and Research (CJER)
 Seminar leader for the Judges College (CJER)
 Adjunct professor of legal research/writing and moot court for the University of California, Riverside
 Adjunct professor of the University of LaVerne School of Law
 Lecturer in legal ethics for the Riverside County Bar Association
 Guest lecturer on law & media at both UCLA and UCR

Community activities
 Founder and Chairmen of UCRLAW
 President of the Citizens University Committee
 Member of the Riverside Community Hospital Founder's Club
 Member of the Frank Miller Club - Mission Inn
 Member of the Ad hoc committee to establish Federal District Court in the Inland Empire
 Member of the Victoria Avenue Forever
 Member of the Riverside Community Hospital Board of Directors
 Member of the University of California, Riverside Foundation Board
 Vice-Chairman of the Riverside County Historical, Commission (Vice-Chair)
 President of the Riverside Opera Association
 President of the Riverside/University Area Kiwanis
 Lt. Governor of the Kiwanis District

Marriage
Ward is married to Carole J. Ward.

Political views
Ward is a registered Republican.

Published works
Publications by Ward include:
 "To Catch a Prince" Air California magazine. (January 1978)
 "To Sell a Valentine" The Thoroughbred of California. (July 1978)
 "Destination Cabo" Pacific Skipper magazine. (December 1979)
 "A Girl, A Horse, A Father" Horseplay magazine. (March 1981)
 "An Insider's View of the Civil Discovery Act of 1986," Litigation in Brief. (1986) 
 "To the U.S. Supreme Court and Back," Statewide Bench/Bar/Media Newsletter. (July 1987) 
 "Commission on Judicial Nominees Evaluation (JNE)," The Legal Secretary. (February 1989)
 Chapter Author, Civil Discovery Practice, California Continuing Education of the Bar (undated)

Awards
 Riverside County Bar Association Distinguished Service Award
 Executive Committee Conference of Delegates Alumni of the Year
 Legal Secretaries Association King Boss Award
 California State Assembly Resolution & Award
 Riverside Downtown Partnership (Chamber of Commerce) - Chairman's Award

See also
 Tim Hays – publisher of The Press-Enterprise

References

External links
 Press-Enterprise Co. v. Superior Court - 464 U.S. 501 (1984)
 Press Enterprise v. Superior Court (II) 478 U.S. 1

Judges of the California Courts of Appeal
1935 births
Municipal judges in the United States
Lawyers from Riverside, California
Living people